Ben Arnold may refer to:

 Ben Arnold, Texas, an unincorporated community in Milam County, Texas, United States
 Ben Arnold (bishop), suffragan bishop of Massachusetts, 1972–1982
 Ben Arnold (racing driver) (1936–2011), stock car racing driver
 Ben Arnold (field hockey) who played for England men's national hockey team
 Ben Arnold (judge) (1892–1955) Associate Justice of the Oklahoma Supreme Court (1941–1953)

See also
Benjamin Arnold (disambiguation)
Benedict Arnold (disambiguation)

Arnold, Ben